MPD Psycho (full title Multiple Personality Detective Psycho – Kazuhiko Amamiya Returns) is a 2000 Japanese six-episode horror crime television series based on the manga of the same name and directed by Takashi Miike. It originally aired on 2 May 2000. It has a surrealist bent, and, according to Jim Harper, the author of Flowers from Hell, "bears little similarity to the average made-for-TV detective thriller".

The plot is similar to the beginning of the manga series but does not relate to the incidents of Lucy Monostone and the Gakuso Company. The story takes place in the final days of the Shōwa Era. Yosuke Kobayashi, a detective assigned to a homicide unit, saw his wife killed by a serial killer, Shinji Nishizono. From the shock of the incident, he suffers from multiple personality disorder and becomes Kazuhiko Amamiya. Soon after, he manages to hunt down and kill his wife's murderer. Now a series of murders has started and the suspect is claiming to be Shinji Nishizono.

Episodes

Background 

The series contains several visual distortions which, mistaken by some to be censorship, are of non-explicit images and have been seen instead as a jab against Japanese censorship.

Critical reception 

DVD Talk called it a "difficult yet fascinating" series that "wraps you up in its nightmarish dreamscapes", writing, "its unending complications will put off many, but for fans of Miike's catalogue or other similarly intentionally dense, style-over-substance material, there's enough here to delight and horrify".

Home video 

The series was first released on DVD by Pony Canyon in Japan.

It was subsequently released on DVD in Australia in 2008 by Siren Visual Entertainment.

References 

 Sources

External links 

 
 

Japanese television miniseries
2000 in Japanese television
Japanese horror fiction television series
Wowow original programming
Films directed by Takashi Miike
Dissociative identity disorder in television
Television shows based on manga